Robert Boyer may refer to:

Robert S. Boyer, professor of computer science, mathematics, and philosophy
See List of Charles Whitman's victims for Robert Hamilton Boyer, professor killed at The University of Texas in 1966
Robert Boyer (artist) (1948–2004), Canadian artist of aboriginal heritage
Robert Boyer (chemist) (1909–1989), chemist employed by Henry Ford
Robert James Boyer (1913–2005), former politician in Ontario, Canada
Bob Boyer (wrestler), retired Canadian professional wrestler

See also
Robert Boyers (1876–1949), American football coach
Robert Bowyer (1758–1834), British painter and publisher